Crosbycus dasycnemus is a species in the order Opiliones ("harvestmen"), in the class Arachnida ("arachnids").
Crosbycus dasycnemus is found in North America.

References

Further reading
 Schönhofer, Axel L. (2013). A Taxonomic Catalogue of the Dyspnoi Hansen and Sørensen, 1904 (Arachnida: Opiliones).
 Shear, William A. (2008). Deletions from the North American harvestman (Opiliones) faunal list: Phalangomma virginicum Roewer, 1949 is a synonym of Erebomaster weyerensis (Packard, 1888) (Travunioidea: Cladonychiidae), and a note on "Crosbycus" goodnightorum Roewer, 1951....

Harvestmen